Coleophora microsticta is a moth of the family Coleophoridae.

References

microsticta
Moths described in 2003